Ógra Fianna Fáil(meaning "Youth of Fianna Fáil") is the youth wing of Fianna Fáil.

The organisation was founded in 1975 by party leader Jack Lynch under the guidance of party general secretary, Séamus Brennan. It is active on an all-Ireland basis, with branches in major third level institutes (called cumainn) and parliamentary constituencies (called Comhairle Dáil Cheantair) in the Republic of Ireland. In Northern Ireland it is organised on a county and city basis, along with third level branches at the University of Ulster and Queen's University Belfast. In October 2014 Ógra became an official full member organisation of European Liberal Youth at their annual congress in Berlin.

Membership
Membership for Ógra Fianna Fáil is open to anyone between the ages of sixteen and thirty who supports the aims and ideals of the organisation and those of the general party itself.

Uachtarán
From the inception of the organisation until 2011 Ógra was chaired by the youngest member of the Fianna Fáil parliamentary party. Since 2011 Ógra have elected a president of the organisation. The first president of Ógra was Eamon Quinlan, who later became mayor of Waterford City in 2015.

In 2013 Blackrock's Kate Feeney was elected as the first female leader of Ógra. She is a daughter of former senator Geraldine Feeney and was elected to Dún Laoghaire-Rathdown County Council whilst president of Ógra in 2014.

Eoin Neylon won the election for president of Ógra two years in a row, in both 2014 and 2015.

James Doyle of Dublin Fingal was elected to the office in November 2016, serving one term.

Dún Laoghaire's Ian Woods was elected to the role in March 2018. He is the grandson of former Government Minister Michael Woods.

Lawrencetown native Tom Cahill was elected as Uachtarán in November 2019. He is the youngest President to date and the first from Galway.

Bryan Mallon was elected as Uachtarán in March 2021. On 20 December 2021 a motion to remove Mallon as president received 62% of support from members, but failed to reach the required 66.7% for it to pass, and so he was not removed from office. This was the first time ever that a motion to remove an officer was submitted.

Niall Gaffney was elected as Uachtarán in April 2022. Niall Gaffney is from the small rural village of Delvin, Co.Westmeath. Niall is a self-employed Barrister working in both Dublin and the Midland Circuit.

Organisation
Ógra Fianna Fáil is organised across all the 32 counties of Ireland, maintaining a presence in most local communities and Third Level institutes. Within Ógra Fianna Fáil there four different types of units that can be formed: Ógra Comhairle Dáil Ceantair (CDC) in the Republic of Ireland, Council District Constituency (CDC) in Northern Ireland, Ógra Comhairle Ceantair (CC), Ógra Third Level Cumann,  and Ógra Coiste Áitiúil. The three governing bodies of Ógra Fianna Fáil are the National Youth Conference, Ógra Central Officer Board and Ógra National Council.

Ógra Comhairle Dáil Ceantair (Ógra CDC) – The Ógra CDC covers the area of the Dáil constituency as set out by the Constituencies Commission, or in some cases where a constituency crosses a County border; it covers the area of that County.
Ógra Council District Constituency (CDC) - The Ógra CDC covers the area of the Local government in Northern Ireland. They have the same status as Comhairle Dáil Ceantair within the organisation.
Ógra Comhairle Ceantair (Ógra CC) – This type of unit is smaller than an Ógra CDC, it only includes the Ógra members who are in a particular part of the constituency, most likely a local electoral area (LEA). Ógra CC members may also be members of a Third Level Cumann and an Ógra CDC.
Ógra Third Level Cumann – Most higher education institutions have an Ógra Fianna Fáil Cumann. These branches generally have similar status to an Ógra CDC.
Ógra Coiste Áitiúil – Ógra members in a particular local area are encouraged to form local units to allow the local members to come together to discuss issues and to organise events to promote Fianna Fáil. This form of Ógra unit was instigated to support the organisation in places where may not be practical or possible for Ógra members to travel long distances to Ógra CC or CDC meetings, or not possible to establish an Ógra CC.
Ógra National Youth Conference (NYC) – The National Youth Conference is the supreme decision-making body of Ógra. The conference takes place every 12–18 months with the venue being decided by interested units presenting their bids to the delegates at National Council. The location for the NYC is rotated between each of the regions: Northern Ireland, Munster, Connacht/Ulster and Leinster. The Conference gives the young members of Fianna Fáil a forum to express their views and opinions and develop national policies. All votes for policy motions and COB positions are carried out via One Member One Vote (OMOV).
Ógra Central Officer Board (COB) – The Central Officer Board is responsible for the management of Ógra. It consists of a President, Policy Director, Campaigns and Events Officer, Membership and Recruitment Officer, Regional Organisers, a Press Officer, Irish and Cultural Officer, International Officer, Equality Officer and the National Youth Officer.
Ógra National Council (NC) – The National Council provides oversight to the work of the Central Officer Board. Meetings are usually held every 8–12 weeks. All members of the organisation are entitled to attend meetings. Unlike the NYC, National Council functions under a delegate system where every registered Ógra CDC and Third Level Cumann is entitled to send 3 delegates ( at least 1 man and 1 woman) to National Council to vote on behalf of their CDC or cumann. These delegates can hold the COB to account, debate policy and submit and vote on motions.

Central Officer Board

Current COB

Third level branches

Kevin Barry Cumann – UCD
The Kevin Barry Cumann is the branch in University College Dublin (UCD). The cumann predates the founding of Ógra Fianna Fáil which was established in 1974. It formally dates to 1957 when led by Gerry Collins, then a student organiser in UCD and later Minister for Foreign Affairs. It is named after UCD student and Irish revolutionary Kevin Barry.

Former members include former European Commissioner Charlie McCreevy, previous ministers Dick Roche and Mary Coughlan, Donegal TD Charlie McConalogue and RTÉ presenter Ryan Tubridy. The author and former political lobbyist Frank Dunlop was also a member.

Malcolm Byrne is a former secretary of the Kevin Barry Cumann.

Pádraig Pearse Cumann – DCU 
The Dublin City University branch is the Pádraig Pearse Cumann, commonly known as The PPC. At the Fianna Fáil National Youth Conference in Roscommon in 2018, it was awarded best delegation.

Donnogh O'Malley Cumann – UCC
The Donogh O'Malley Cumann is the University College Cork branch of Ógra. Founded in 1967, its first AGM was chaired by Jack Lynch . Former members of the cumann include the current leader of the party Taoiseach Micheál Martin, Minister for Public Expenditure and Reform Michael McGrath (Irish politician), Minister for Education Norma Foley and Senator Lorraine Clifford-Lee.

They currently hold the joint record for the most Gobnait O’Connell Awards won with 4 in the years 2001, 2015, 2019 & most recently in 2021. They also hold the joint record for most Gobnait O’Connell Awards won consecutively which is 2 in a row.

Wolfe Tone Cumann – Trinity College Dublin (TCD)
The Trinity College branch is named in honor of Irish revolutionary and Trinity graduate, Theobald Wolfe Tone. The Cumann was officially constituted in 1967 and was initially named after Erskine Childers. In 1998 the cumann was renamed the Wolfe Tone Cumann, to mark the bicentenary of the 1798 Rebellion. It has a long history of activism within Ógra on a national basis. Past members include; Thomas Byrne, Seán Haughey, Jack Chambers, James Lawless, Mary Lou McDonald, Mary Harney and Dara Calleary.

Cumann De Barra – NUIG
Cumann De Barra is the branch in the National University of Ireland, Galway (NUIG). Meetings were held off campus for many years before it was officially recognised by university authorities and allowed to host itself as an official society of the university in 1954. Like its sister Cumann in University College Dublin (UCD), it is also named after Kevin Barry, a medical student at UCD who fought and was executed during the Irish War of Independence. To avoid confusion however, it officially changed its name to the Irish language version to reflect NUIG's reputation as the Irish language university.

Cumann de Barra currently hold the joint record for the most Gobnait O'Connell Award victories with 4, their most recent win being in Limerick in 2016.

Some notable former members include former Fianna Fáil TD Michael P. Kitt, the President of Ireland Michael D. Higgins (before he joined the Labour Party), Senator Terry Leyden, Senator Lisa Chambers and former MEP Seán Ó Neachtain.

Other Third level branches
National University of Ireland, Maynooth – Seán Lemass Cumann
Queen's University Belfast – Mary McAleese Cumann
University of Limerick – Con Colbert Cumann
University of Ulster – Watty Graham Cumann
Galway-Mayo Institute of Technology
Institute of Technology, Carlow – James Fintan Lalor Cumann
Dublin Institute of Technology
Waterford Institute of Technology – Thomas Francis Meagher Cumann
Carlow College Cumann

Awards

Each year at the National Youth Conference, the organisation gives out 4 awards:

Gobnait O'Connell Award 
The Gobnait O'Connell memorial award was first announced at the National Youth Conference 2000 in Westport, Co. Mayo.  The award is named after Gobnait O’Connell, Youth and Membership Development Officer of Fianna Fáil from 1997 to 2000 who was killed in a car accident in September 2000. During her time working for Fianna Fáil her passion and support for Ógra was widely recognised among members.  The prize will be awarded to the Best Ógra of each year and a perpetual trophy and a cash prize will be presented at each Youth Conference.

Gobnait O'Connell Winners 
2022 - Con Colbert Cumann, UL

2021 - Donogh O’Malley Cumann, UCC

2019 - Donogh O'Malley Cumann, UCC

2018 - Laois Ógra CDC

2016 - Cumann de Barra, NUIG

2015 - Donogh O'Malley Cumann, UCC

2014 - Wolfe Tone Cumann, TCD

2013 - Cumann de Barra, NUIG

2012 - Con Colbert Cumann, UL

2009 - Tipperary North CDC

2008 - Limerick West CDC

2007 - Cumann de Barra, NUIG

2006 - Cumann de Barra, NUIG

2005 - Tipperary North CDC

2002 - Clare CDC

2001 - Donogh O' Malley Cumann, UCC

Frain Award 
The Frain award is presented to the best non-third level unit in Ógra at the National Youth Conference. The award is named after former Ógra member Darragh Frain from Galway, who died in 2016.

Darragh Frain award Winners 
2022 - Offaly CDC

2021 - Kildare North CDC

2020 - Kildare North CDC

2019 - Tipperary CDC

2018 - Roscommon CDC

2016 - Laois CDC

Best Speaker Award 
To recognise the best speaker during the National Youth Conference.

Best speaker Winners 
2022 - Ruairí Ryan

2021 - Niall Gaffney

2019 - Rory Hogan

2018 - Ryan O'Meara

2016 - Ammar Ali

2014 - Susan Whelan

2011 - Gábháin Ó Comhraí

Biggest Delegation Award 
To recognise the unit with the largest number of delegates at the National Youth Conference.

Biggest Delegation Winners 
2022 - Kevin Barry Cumann, UCD

2021 - Not Awarded

2019 - QUB

2018 - DCU

Presidential Award for Distinguished Service Winners 
2022 - Awarded by Bryan Mallon - Briege MacOscar, Ian Woods & Shane Curley

2021 - Awarded by Tom Cahill - Kate Feeney, Eoin Neylon & Peter Caulfield

Notes

References

External links

Fianna Fáil
Youth wings of political parties in Ireland
Youth wings of conservative parties
Youth wings of political parties in Northern Ireland
Youth organizations established in 1975
1975 establishments in Ireland
All-Ireland organisations
Irish republican organisations
Student organisations in Northern Ireland
Student organisations in the Republic of Ireland